Simopoulos is a Greek surname. The feminine form is Simopoulou (Σιμοπούλου). Notable people with the surname include:

Charalambos Simopoulos (1874-1942), Greek diplomat
Dionysis Simopoulos (born 1943), Greek physicist and astronomer
Panayiotis Simopoulos, Greek model

Greek-language surnames
Surnames
Patronymic surnames